Chestnut Mountain is a mountain in the North Carolina High Country, United States, and wholly in the Pisgah National Forest.  Its elevation reaches 2,480 feet (756 m) and is split between Burke County and Caldwell counties.  The mountain generates feeder streams for the Catawba River.

See also
List of mountains in North Carolina

References

Mountains of North Carolina
Protected areas of Burke County, North Carolina
Protected areas of Caldwell County, North Carolina
Pisgah National Forest
Mountains of Burke County, North Carolina
Mountains of Caldwell County, North Carolina